Kalohydnobius is a genus of round fungus beetles in the family Leiodidae. There are at least 4 described species in Kalohydnobius.

Species
 K. californicus Peck and Cook, 2009
 K. dentatus Peck & Cook, 2009
 K. southeastern-non-dentatus
 K. strigilatus (Horn, 1880)

References

Citations

Sources

 Majka C, Langor D (2008). "The Leiodidae (Coleoptera) of Atlantic Canada: new records, faunal composition, and zoogeography". . ZooKeys 2: 357–402.
 Peck, Stewart B., and Joyce Cook (2009). "Review of the Sogdini of North and Central America (Coleoptera: Leiodidae: Leiodinae) with descriptions of fourteen new species and three new genera".

Further reading

 Arnett, R.H. Jr., M. C. Thomas, P. E. Skelley and J. H. Frank. (eds.). (2002). American Beetles, Volume II: Polyphaga: Scarabaeoidea through Curculionoidea. CRC Press LLC, Boca Raton, FL.
 
 Richard E. White. (1983). Peterson Field Guides: Beetles. Houghton Mifflin Company.

Leiodidae